Shehan (Sinhala: ශෙහාන්) is a Sinhalese name that may refer to the following notable people:
Given name
Shehan Ambepitiya (born 1990), Sri Lankan sprinter
Shehan Fernando (born 1993), Sri Lankan cricketer
Shehan Hettiarachchi (born 1994), Sri Lankan cricketer
Shehan Hirudika (born 1990), Sri Lankan cricketer
Shehan Jayasuriya (born 1991), Sri Lankan cricketer
Shehan Kamileen, Canadian cricketer
Shehan Karunatilaka (born 1975), Sri Lankan writer 
Shehan Madushanka (born 1995), Sri Lankan cricketer 
Shehan Pathirana (born 1992), Sri Lankan rugby union player
Shehan Sandaruwan (born 1996), Sri Lankan cricketer
Shehan de Silva (born 1992), Sri Lankan cricketer

Surname
Lawrence Shehan (1898–1984), American prelate of the Roman Catholic Church
Malindu Shehan (born 1994), Sri Lankan cricketer
Rukshan Shehan (born 1995), Sri Lankan cricketer
Steve Shehan (born 1957), French-American percussionist and music composer

See also
Sheehan

Sinhalese masculine given names
Sinhalese surnames